Bohuslavice is a municipality and village in Opava District in the Moravian-Silesian Region of the Czech Republic. It has about 1,800 inhabitants. It is part of the historic Hlučín Region.

History
The first written mention of Bohuslavice is from 1288. Until 1920, it belonged to the Prussian province of Silesia.

After the Munich Agreement in 1938, Bohuslavice was annexed by Nazi Germany.

References

External links

Bohuslavice
Hlučín Region